Eugene L. "Gene" Laughlin (born 1938) is an American former politician in the state of Washington.  He was in the Washington House of Representatives from 1973 to 1977, from the 17th district, which included Klickitat County, Skamania County, and part of Clark County.

References

Living people
1938 births
Democratic Party members of the Washington House of Representatives
People from Peoria, Illinois
Western Washington University alumni